Events from the year 1853 in Sweden

Incumbents
 Monarch – Oscar I

Events
 The first Telegraphy net are being constructed. 
 The first Gasworks in Sweden.
 Street lights by gas lighting are introduced in the capital.  
 Coffee brand Gevalia is launched. 
 The choir Orphei Drängar is founded. 
 The profession of teacher at public primary and elementary schools are opened to both sexes. 
 1853 Stockholm cholera outbreak.

Births
 3 January - Sophie Elkan, writer (died 1921) 
 15 February - Edvard Swartz, stage actor (died 1897) 
 20 February - Amanda Röntgen-Maier, violinist and composer  (died 1894)
 17 May - Carolina Östberg, opera singer  (died 1924) 
 28 May - Carl Larsson, painter (died 1919) 
 11 June - Alma Åkermark, feminist and editor  (died 1933)
 10 September - Gertrud Adelborg, leading member of the women's rights movement  (died 1942) 
 - Maria Westberg, ballerina  (died 1893)

Deaths

 - Maria Johanna Görtz, painter  (born 1783) 
 - Jeanette Wässelius, opera singer  (born 1784)
 Sven Erlandsson textile artist (born 1768)

References

 
Years of the 19th century in Sweden